Bryan Sanders (born October 24, 1970) is an American former ski jumper who competed in the 1992 Winter Olympics.

References

1970 births
Living people
People from Stillwater, Minnesota
American male ski jumpers
Olympic ski jumpers of the United States
Ski jumpers at the 1992 Winter Olympics